Proculus Verginius Tricostus Rutilus was a Roman statesman who served as Consul.

From his filiation, it appears likely that he was the son of Opiter Verginius Tricostus (consul 502 BC) and the brother of Titus Verginius Tricostus Rutilus (consul 479 BC), Opiter Verginius Tricostus Esquilinus (suffect consul 478 BC), and Aulus Verginius Tricostus Rutilus (consul 476 BC).

Consulship
In 486 BC Proculus Verginius Tricostus Rutilus and Spurius Cassius Vecellinus were elected Consul. Verginius marched against the Aequi and opposed the agrarian law of his colleague Cassius.

Cassius was accused of trying to create support in the populace and allies to seek kingship. In a partisan struggle, Verginius sided with the Roman patricians, and Cassius the Roman plebeians. Upon retirement from office, Cassius was condemned and put to death.

Notes

References
  Livy, Histoire romaine, Livre II, 41 sur le site de l'Université de Louvain ;
 Dionysius of Halicarnassus, Antiquités romaines, Livre VIII, 63-80 sur le site LacusCurtius.

5th-century BC Roman consuls
Tricostus Rutilus, Proculus